Curtis Mar (born 6 August 1967) is a Fijian international lawn bowler and team manager.

In 2008 he won the silver medal in the triples at the 2008 World Outdoor Bowls Championship in Christchurch along with Keshwa Goundar and Samuela Tuikiligana.

In 2016 he was the team manager during the 2016 World Outdoor Bowls Championship.

References

External links
 

Fijian male bowls players
1967 births
Living people
Bowls players at the 2006 Commonwealth Games
Commonwealth Games competitors for Fiji